So Good (stylized as SO GOOD) is the seventh extended play by South Korean girl group T-ara. It was released on August 4, 2015 by MBK Entertainment.

Release
On July, 2015, it was revealed that the group would be returning with a new album the following month and that the group are ready for their Chinese promotions and that they have been starting to work on their new Chinese album since the start of the year.

On August 4, the girls promoted their comeback with the single "So Crazy". On August 12, the group started their promotions in China with the song "So Crazy (Chinese Version)" and also released a music video.

Commercial performance
So Good entered at number 5 on the Gaon Album Chart, on the chart issue dated August 9–15, 2015. In its second week, the EP peaked at number 4.

The EP entered at number 8 on the chart for the month of August 2015, with 20,629 physical copies. The EP sold 20,695 physical copies in 2015, placing at number 74 for the year-end chart.

Track listing
Digital download

Charts

Sales

Lists

Release history

References

2015 EPs
T-ara albums
Korean-language EPs
Chinese-language EPs
Interpark Music EPs